San Lazzaro di Savena is an Italian comune (municipality) of some 32,000 inhabitants in the Metropolitan City of Bologna, Emilia-Romagna.

Geography 
The town is located on the Via Emilia, a major thoroughfare for town traffic,  from the city centre of Bologna towards the southeast.

The territory of the municipality extends towards the plain and at the foot of the first hills around Bologna.  Some watercourses such as the Zena (creek), the Idice and the Savena, after which the town was named, flow through the town.

History 
The area of San Lazzar has been inhabited since ancient times, as testified by findings from the Stone Age (stone implements) and the Bronze Age; along with nearby Castenaso, it witnessed a flourishing Villanovian civilization.

Documents state the site for the town once housed a lazzaretto or leprosarium. These were often located outside of cities where people could be segregated from the population.

The town was autonomous municipality in the Napoleonic Era (1810). It was afterwards readmitted to Bologna and gained back autonomy with the help of Carlo Berti Pichat after 1827.

Nowadays, after the building expansion of the 1970s, San Lazzaro is one of the most populated towns in the province of Bologna and is the main seat of a large number of factories.

Main sights
In San Lazzaro the museum of prehistory "Luigi Donini" gathering  findings of ancient times has been recently opened.

Sports
The town's football team is A.C. Boca San Lazzaro, currently playing amateur football in Serie D after being relegated from Serie C2 after the 2006–07 season.

The former World Cup alpine ski racer Alberto Tomba was born in San Lazzaro di Savena.

External links

 Googlemap: Mappa satellitare di San Lazzaro
 Parco dei Gessi Bolognesi e Calanchi dell'Abbadessa
 Comune di San Lazzaro di Savena

Cities and towns in Emilia-Romagna
Villanovan culture